The Death Mask is a 1914 American short drama film directed and produced by Thomas H. Ince and featuring Sessue Hayakawa and Tsuru Aoki in prominent roles.

References

External links 
 

1914 drama films
1914 films
1914 short films
American silent short films
American black-and-white films
Silent American drama films
Films directed by Thomas H. Ince
1910s American films